Lokhvytsia Raion (translit.: Lóchvyc’kyj Rajón) was a raion (district) in Poltava Oblast in central Ukraine. The raion's administrative center was the city of Lokhvytsia. The raion was abolished and its territory was merged into Myrhorod Raion on 18 July 2020 as part of the administrative reform of Ukraine, which reduced the number of raions of Poltava Oblast to four. The last estimate of the raion population was 

An important river within the Lokhvytskyi Raion was the Sula River. The raion was established on 1971.

Settlements

References

Former raions of Poltava Oblast
1971 establishments in Ukraine
Ukrainian raions abolished during the 2020 administrative reform